Kristianstads IP is a football stadium in Kristianstad, Sweden. Kristianstads IP has a total capacity of 6,000 spectators.

References 

Football venues in Sweden
American football venues in Sweden
20th-century establishments in Skåne County